German submarine U-711 was a Type VIIC U-boat of Nazi Germany's Kriegsmarine during World War II.

Ordered 7 December 1940, laid down, 31 July 1941 and launched 25 June 1942. She was commanded by Oberleutnant zur See Hans-Günther Lange (who was awarded the Knights Cross).

Design
German Type VIIC submarines had a displacement of  when at the surface and  while submerged. She had two shafts and two  propellers.

U-711 was fitted with five  torpedo tubes (four fitted at the bow and one at the stern), fourteen torpedoes, one  SK C/35 naval gun, 220 rounds, removed in the summer of 1944, when she was fitted with the schnorkeland and two, twin  C/30 anti-aircraft guns. The boat had a complement of between forty-four and sixty.

Service history

During her active service career, U-711 sank 2 ships and damaged a third.

U-711 attacked and sank the British corvette  on 17 February 1945 with an acoustic homing torpedo, which caused her depth charges to explode. Bluebell sank in less than 30 seconds and from her crew of 86 there was only one survivor.

Fate
On 4 May 1945, U-711 was sunk by aircraft of the Fleet Air Arm during Operation Judgement, an attack on the depot ships  and Senja anchored at Kilbotn, south of Harstad, Norway. This was the last air-raid of the war in Europe.

Avenger and Wildcat aircraft, from FAA Squadrons 846, 853 and 882, operating from the British escort carriers ,  and  sank the Black Watch with 7 direct hits and 4 near misses. U-711, was moored alongside and was damaged but managed to sail away. The U-Boat had a harbour crew of eight on board, including the captain, who all survived although forty of her crew who were berthed on the depot ship were killed.  The submarine later sank.

A few hours earlier Lange had received the signal from Germany ordering all U-boats to cease attacks on allied shipping.

Wolfpacks
U-711 took part in nine wolfpacks, namely:
 Wiking (1 August – 20 September 1943) 
 Blitz (24 March – 5 April 1944) 
 Keil (11 – 14 April 1944) 
 Donner & Keil (24 April – 3 May 1944) 
 Grimm (31 May – 6 June 1944) 
 Trutz (8 June – 7 July 1944) 
 Greif (3 – 18 August 1944) 
 Rasmus (9 – 13 February 1945) 
 Hagen (15 – 21 March 1945)

Summary of raiding history

Dive site
As no-one was killed during her sinking, U-711's location is not classed as a war grave and is a well-documented dive-site, lying at approximately 50 meters depth and only having minor damage.

References

Notes

Citations

Bibliography

External links

German Type VIIC submarines
U-boats commissioned in 1942
1942 ships
U-boats sunk in 1945
World War II submarines of Germany
Ships built in Hamburg
U-boats sunk by British aircraft
U-boats sunk by depth charges
World War II shipwrecks in the Norwegian Sea
Maritime incidents in May 1945